Readinger is a surname. Notable people with the surname include:

Alexis Readinger (born 1975), American hospitality designer
David Readinger (born 1935), American politician